Catherine Everett may refer to:

 A. Catherine Everett, Canadian judge
 Catherine Everett (painter) (born 1957), Canadian abstract painter